Sopot Municipality is a municipality in Plovdiv Province, Bulgaria.

Religion
According to the latest Bulgarian census of 2011, the religious composition, among those who answered the optional question on religious identification, was the following:

References

Municipalities in Plovdiv Province